George D. Archibald (1820–1902) was a Presbyterian minister, author, and academic.

Biography
George D. Archibald was born in Washington County, Pennsylvania on February 15, 1820.  He graduated from Jefferson College in 1847. He was president of Hanover College from 1868 to 1870.

He died at his home in Covington, Kentucky on September 25, 1902.

References

1820 births
1902 deaths
American Presbyterian ministers
Hanover College
People from Washington County, Pennsylvania
Washington & Jefferson College alumni
Heads of universities and colleges in the United States
19th-century American clergy